The military industry of Egypt is an robust industry that produces defense and security products that range from "small arms to armored vehicles to naval vessels" for the Egyptian Armed Forces and export. Egypt also has co-production agreements with several countries, including the United States and France.

History 
As World War II approached its end, Egypt came into possession of a large quantity and variety of armaments left behind by Nazi Germany, This included large stockpiles of 8mm Mauser ammunition that had been manufactured by several Axis countries. The Egyptian government decided to manufacture a semi-automatic battle rifle and purchased the tooling and plans for the Swedish Automatgevär m/42 (Ag m/42) rifle, and re-engineered it to use the 8mm Mauser cartridges and a gas adjustment valve. The resulting Hakim Rifle was manufactured and fielded from the early 1950s until about 1961. Egypt also briefly manufactured another re-engineered Ag ms/42, chambered for the 7.62×39mm Soviet cartridge, called the Rasheed Carbine. These guns were replaced in the 1960s by the Maadi AK-47, a licensed copy of the widely distributed Soviet automatic assault rifle.

During the late 1950s, Egypt built the Jabal Hamzah ballistic missile test and launch facility to test-fire and to experiment with the indigenously built Al Zafir and Al Kahir SRBMs.

Operation Cyclone

Egypt was involved in supplying the Central Intelligence Agency with various weapons for Operation Cyclone during the Soviet–Afghan War. CIA Officer Gust Avrakotos set up a deal with Egyptian Defense Minister Abd al-Halim Abu Ghazala for Egypt to manufacture .303 ammunition for the hundreds of thousands of Lee–Enfield rifles that it supplied to the Afghan mujahideen through Pakistan's Inter Services Intelligence. Congressman Charlie Wilson helped lower political barriers for the deals to go through.

Organisation
The military industry in Egypt is organised across the following organisations:
 Egyptian Armaments Authority (EAA) which serves as the Egyptian military's acquisition arm for military hardware 
 Arab Organization for Industrialization (AOI) which owns and operates 23 defense manufacturing factories and the Egyptian Aerospace research center 
 National Service Projects Organization (NSPO) which owns several companies and supplies the Egyptian military and exports excess products
 Armed Forces Engineering Authority (AEA) which is responsible for mega projects

Egyptian Defense Expo
The Egyptian Defense Expo (EDEX) is held in Cairo every two years.

See also
 Egyptian Armed Forces:
 National Service Products Organization
 General Services Organization
 Ministry of Defense (Egypt):
 Marine Industries & Services Organization
 Ministry of Military Production (Egypt)
 Arab Organization for Industrialization

References

Military of Egypt
Science and technology in Egypt
Egypt